Yahballaha II bar Qayyoma was Patriarch of the Church of the East from 1190 to 1222.

Sources 
Brief accounts of Yahballaha's patriarchate are given in the Ecclesiastical Chronicle of the Jacobite writer Bar Hebraeus and in the ecclesiastical histories of the fourteenth-century Nestorian writers Amr and Sliba.

Yahballaha's patriarchate 
The following account of Yahballaha's patriarchate is given by Bar Hebraeus:

He [Eliya III] was succeeded by Yahballaha Bar Qayyoma, a man of Mosul who had earlier been bishop of Maiperqat and then metropolitan of Nisibis.  He used extraordinary boldness to secure the patriarchate.  When he arrived in Baghdad after the death of the catholicus Eliya Abu Halim, he realised that neither the bishops nor the people of Baghdad would consent to his election, so he bought the governor's support with a bribe of 7,000 gold dinars and thus forced the bishops to consecrate him.  When he returned to Seleucia and inspected the cell in the Greek Palace, he did not like it, despite its splendid appearance, so he closed it and went to live in the church of the third ward.  He died on the second Sunday of the month, on the sixteenth day of the eleventh month of the year 618 of the Arabs [AD 1222], and was buried on the eastern side of the church of the blessed Mary, mother of God.

See also
 List of patriarchs of the Church of the East

References

Citations

Bibliography
 Abbeloos, J. B., and Lamy, T. J., Bar Hebraeus, Chronicon Ecclesiasticum (3 vols, Paris, 1877)
 Assemani, J. A., De Catholicis seu Patriarchis Chaldaeorum et Nestorianorum (Rome, 1775)
 Brooks, E. W., Eliae Metropolitae Nisibeni Opus Chronologicum (Rome, 1910)
 Gismondi, H., Maris, Amri, et Salibae: De Patriarchis Nestorianorum Commentaria I: Amri et Salibae Textus (Rome, 1896)
 Gismondi, H., Maris, Amri, et Salibae: De Patriarchis Nestorianorum Commentaria II: Maris textus arabicus et versio Latina (Rome, 1899)

Patriarchs of the Church of the East
12th-century bishops of the Church of the East
Nestorians in the Abbasid Caliphate
13th-century bishops of the Church of the East
1222 deaths